The 1999 Yale Bulldogs football team represented Yale University in the 1999 NCAA Division I-AA football season.  The Bulldogs were led by third-year head coach Jack Siedlecki, played their home games at the Yale Bowl and finished tied for first place in the Ivy League with a 6–1 record, 9–1 overall.

Schedule

Roster

References

Yale
Yale Bulldogs football seasons
Ivy League football champion seasons
Yale Bulldogs football